James Armstrong (1728–1800)  served in the Continental Army, in the 2nd Pennsylvania Regiment, 3rd Pennsylvania Regiment.

History
James Armstrong was born in 1728, in Pennsylvania. Much of his early life is unknown. He served in the Revolutionary War, starting in February 1776 when he became Regional Quartermaster of the 2nd Pennsylvania Regiment of the Continental Army. He became an ensign of the 5th Company of the same regiment on 21 May, and was promoted to second lieutenant on 11 November. He was commissioned as first lieutenant of the 3rd Pennsylvania Regiment in April 1777.

After the war, Armstrong was admitted as an original member of the Society of the Cincinnati in the state of Pennsylvania.

He received one electoral vote in the first U.S. presidential election.

References

Bibliography

Metcalf, Bryce (1938). Original Members and Other Officers Eligible to the Society of the Cincinnati, 1783-1938: With the Institution, Rules of Admission, and Lists of the Officers of the General and State Societies  Strasburg, VA: Shenandoah Publishing House, Inc.

External links
 The Society of the Cincinnati
 The American Revolution Institute

1728 births
1800 deaths
Continental Army officers from Georgia (U.S. state)
Candidates in the 1788–1789 United States presidential election
Members of the Georgia House of Representatives